Big Cook, Little Cook is a British children's television series created by Adrian Hedley for BBC television. The programme is set in the kitchen of a café, with two chef characters; Big Cook Ben/Jen and Little Cook Small. CBeebies aired repeats on the channel until 2012.

Ben/Jen are both full sized adult/s, but Small is only a few inches tall and flies around on a wooden spoon. Ben and the original Small were played by Steve Marsh and Dan Wright, respectively. 

An official magazine was launched in August 2005.

The show made a comeback with a revival series in 2022, now presented by Ibinabo Jack as Big Cook Jen and Courtney Bowman as Little Cook Small.

Format
The format of the programme generally includes a visit to the café by a nursery rhyme, fairy tale, or fictional character (such as Little Miss Muffet or Humpty Dumpty). Each episode would begin with Big Cook Ben and Little Cook Small doing an activity or encountering a problem, and then a customer would arrive by the door of their café with Small giving the viewers and Ben hints about who the customer is.

After revealing the customer, Small then tells a short story about the visitor and ends his stories proclaiming to be the real hero. Next, they decide to cook the customer a meal from Ben's recipe book, and then collect the ingredients from either; the fridge, freezer, cupboard, fruitbowl & vegetable basket (added in series 3). If an ingredient is missing or if one of the two want to know how an ingredient is made, Small will then fly away on his magic spoon-mobile to see where one of the ingredients is made, such as a chutney factory or a rice field. These were filmed in factories and plantations mainly in the UK, Germany, Austria, France and occasionally in some other countries.

Once Small gets the ingredient or tells Ben how an ingredient is made, the two proceed to sing a song, remind the viewers of what is required for the recipe, and begin to cook. During preparation, Ben would remind the viewers to always ask their "grown-up helper" when it came to using knives, allergy information, and using the electrical appliances. After finishing the meal and serving it to the customer, they then sing a song about cleaning up the kitchen. In return for cooking a meal for the visitor, they receive a gift that would solve their problem.

Activities within the kitchen, such as washing and tidying up, are accompanied by a catchy song and dance routines.

Both cooks act in an expansive and overblown style, but the show seems intended to encourage children to take an interest in cooking. The cooks rhyme a lot, like "We need a story to help us cook. Let's take a look in Little Cook's Book. Where do we look for things to cook?" Big Cook does most of the actual cooking and telling the viewers how to make the recipes while Little Cook does some preparation or sets the timer. Some of the aerial shots of Little Cook flying were filmed over the town of Skipton, North Yorkshire.

The revival series follows the same pattern – however, the part where Big Cook collects the ingredients is now omitted, and there is always one ingredient missing.

Development
Production on the series was first announced in 2003. The series was originally planned to be produced by the BBC in-house. Development for the reboot was first hinted at by producer Dot to Dot Productions in October 2021 on their Facebook account, referred to as a "reboot of an iconic CBeebies brand". The reboot was announced on February 18, 2022, with a premiere date on CBeebies set for February 28th. Michael Schlingmann

Original series (2004–06)

Series 1 (2004)

Series 2 (2004)

Series 3 (2006)

Revival Series (2022–present)

Series 4 (2022)

Series 5 (2022)

Home Media
BBC Worldwide released several DVDs of the series in the United Kingdom.

References

External links

2000s preschool education television series
2020s preschool education television series
2004 British television series debuts
BBC children's television shows
2000s British cooking television series
2020s British cooking television series
British cooking television shows
British preschool education television series
British television series revived after cancellation
CBeebies
English-language television shows
Television shows based on fairy tales
Works based on nursery rhymes